The Call of the Void Podcast is an audio drama podcast created and written by Josie Eli Herman and Michael Alan Herman. The story takes place in modern day New Orleans and incorporates elements of cosmic horror and weird fiction.

Background 
The podcast contains three seasons of episodes with a cast of about 35 actors.

Plot
Set in New Orleans, Topher Sommers (a local tour guide) and Etsy Delmen (a palm reader) team up to battle a mysterious entity that longs to bring the world into perfect stillness.

Reception
The show was part of the official selection of the UK International Radio Drama Festival, and has been showcased on numerous lists for top audio fiction, including BuzzFeed.

Awards

Cast

Season 1

 Bruce Bennett as Victor Sommers
 Amanda Buchalter as Simone Sommers
 Mary Clairmont as Janis Fletcher
 Tim Clairmont as Dr. Wilkhart
 Mat De Lisle as Baker
 Annie Dilworth as Hannah Pauling / Nox
 David Galido as Hogan Jones
 Julia Garlotte as Dr. Joanne Delmen
 Angel Geter as Lottie / Nurse Abigail
 James Herman as James Herman
 Josie Eli Herman as Etsy Delmen
 Michael Alan Herman as Topher Sommers
 Dan Johnson as Officer Mason / Necromon
 Paul Lapczynski as Sheriff Paul
 Roni Lapczynski as Charlie the Checkout Girl
 Allyson Miko as Nurse Johnson
 Kellie Stonebrook as Professor Navarro
 Barbaro Tran Suarez as Marcus Fletcher
 Joe Zettelmaier as Walt Rogers / Malcolm Delmen

Season 2

 Bruce Bennett as Victor Sommers
 Kryssy Becker as Peyton Miller / Dr. Jenner
 Amanda Buchalter as Simone Sommers
 Matt Cameron as Emerson Parker / The Organist
 Mary Clairmont as The Apartment Assistant
 Tim Clairmont as Ernest the Prison Guard
 Jonathan Davidson as Jonah
 Mat De Lisle as Baker
 Annie Dilworth as Fargo Kaminski
 Jessica Dudek as KP
 Craig Ester as Lester Thompson / JM Labs Council Member
 Julia Garlotte as Dr. Joanne Delmen / Olivia
 Angel Geter as Lottie
 James Herman as Little Brother
 Josie Eli Herman as Etsy Delmen
 Matthew Herman as Odin at the Voodoo Shop / Graduation Announcer
 Michael Alan Herman as Topher Sommers
 Dan Johnson as Officer Mason / Necromon
 Paul Lapczynski as Rando / Police Officer
 Billy and Georgie Lapczynski as Martin Brody
 Allison Megroet as Dani Parker
 Jackie Meloche as Miles
 Vicki Morgan as Marley Thompson / Ashley the Waitress
 Scotty Schlueter as Mitchell Lou
 Shelby Seeley as London / Monica
 Mark Ujik as Carson
 Joe Zettelmaier as Malcolm Delmen / Documentarian

Season 3

 Kryssy Becker as Gwyneth O'Conner
 Emily Betz as Riley / Brooklyn the LA Waitress / Casino Voice
 Amanda Buchalter as Simone Sommers
 Callie Bussell as Tera Grace Reinhart
 Nick Casella as Fry / Correctional Officer
 Tim Clairmont as Jacko
 David Collins as Beau / Chesney Price
 Celah Convis - Taylor the Checkout Girl / Showgirl
 Jonathan Davidson as Jonah
 Annie Dilworth as Fargo Kaminski
 Jayla Fletcher as Ivy / Becky Mason
 Julia Garlotte as Dr. Joanne Delmen
 Linda Rabin Hammell as Meg the Trucker / Margie
 Josie Eli Herman as Etsy Delmen
 Michael Alan Herman as Topher Sommers
 Erin Isely as Sous Chef / Theatre Patron / Mae
 Dan Johnson as Officer Mason / Necromon
 Paul Lapczynski as Deputy Paul / Murphy's Bartender
 Billy and Georgie Lapczynski as Martin Brody
 Allison Megroet as Dani Parker
 Jeffrey Shawn Miller as Professor Andrew Fulton
 Will Myers as The Whispermen / The Lighthouse Keeper
 Tim Pollack as Zeke / Leroy Benjamin
 Mike Sandusky as Jason / Steven the Researcher
 Josh Weber as Eli Cohen
 Mark Ujik as Gibby
 Joe Zettelmaier as Malcolm Delmen & Tony the Sheriff

References

External links 

Horror podcasts
Science fiction podcasts
2020 podcast debuts
Audio podcasts
Scripted podcasts
American radio dramas